Negro Creek flows into the Black River in Castorland, New York.

References 

Rivers of New York (state)